The silver-backed needletail (Hirundapus cochinchinensis) is a species of swift in the family Apodidae.
It is found in Southeast Asia, Sumatra, Java and Taiwan.  It is a vagrant to Christmas Island.
Its natural habitat is subtropical or tropical moist lowland forests.

References

silver-backed needletail
Birds of Nepal
Birds of Northeast India
Birds of Hainan
Birds of Taiwan
Birds of Southeast Asia
silver-backed needletail
Taxonomy articles created by Polbot